Persian War may refer to:
 Persian War (horse) (1963–1984), British-trained racehorse
 Persian Wars or Greco-Persian Wars
 Persian War, the first two books of The Wars of Justinian by Procopius

See also
 Anglo-Persian War
 Gulf War (1991), also known as the Persian Gulf War, Operation Granby, or Operation Desert Storm
 Iran–Iraq War (1980–1988), also known as the Persian Gulf War or the First Gulf War
 Iraq War (2003–2011), also known as the Second or Third Gulf War
 Persian Wars (disambiguation)
 Roman–Persian Wars
 Russo-Persian War (1651–53)
 Russo-Persian War (1722–23)
 Russo-Persian War (1804–13)
 Russo-Persian War (1826–28)
 Russo-Persian Wars
 Persian Expedition of 1796 (Russo-Persian War of 1796)
 Turco–Persian Wars (disambiguation)